The 1992 Southeastern Conference baseball tournament was held at the Louisiana Superdome in New Orleans, LA from May 13 through 17.  won the tournament and earned the Southeastern Conference's automatic bid to the 1992 NCAA Tournament.

Regular-season results

Tournament 

 Ole Miss, Tennessee, Kentucky, and Alabama did not make the tournament.

All-Tournament Team

See also 
 College World Series
 NCAA Division I Baseball Championship
 Southeastern Conference baseball tournament

References 

 SECSports.com All-Time Baseball Tournament Results
 SECSports.com All-Tourney Team Lists

Tournament
Southeastern Conference Baseball Tournament
Southeastern Conference baseball tournament
Southeastern Conference baseball tournament
1990s in New Orleans
Baseball competitions in New Orleans
College baseball tournaments in Louisiana